The Coral Reefer Band is the touring and recording band of American singer-songwriter Jimmy Buffett.  The band's name alludes to both coral reefs (in line with Buffett's tropical-themed music) and "reefer" (slang for marijuana).

Origins

Current line-up
, the band's line-up consists of:
Jimmy Buffett – vocals, rhythm guitar (1974–present)
Michael Utley – keyboards (1975–present)
Robert Greenidge – steel drums (1983–present)
Peter Mayer – lead guitar, vocals (1989–present)
Jim Mayer – bass, vocals (1989–present)
Roger Guth – drums (1989–present)
John Lovell – trumpet (1992–present)
Mac McAnally – vocals, rhythm and lead guitars, dobro, slide guitar (1994–present)
Tina Gullickson – guitar, vocals (1995–present)
Nadirah Shakoor – vocals (1995–present)
Doyle Grisham – pedal steel guitar (1974–present)
 Eric Darken – percussion (2011–present)

Former members
Other former members of the Coral Reefer Band include:
 Philip Fajardo – Drums (1975–1976)
 Tim Drummond – Bass Guitar (1986–1988)
Ralph MacDonald – Percussion (1974–2011; died 2011)
Jerry Jeff Walker – Guitar, background vocals, composer
Marshall Chapman – guitar, background vocals (1987); co-writer "Last Mango in Paris," writer "The Perfect Partner"
Lanny Fiel – Guitar
Rick Fiel – Bass guitar
Dave Haney – Bass guitar
Paul Tabet – Drums
Bergen White – Trombone
Daniel "Stiles" Francisco – Trumpet
Bobby Thompson – Banjo
Hamilton Camp – Guitar
Doug Bartenfeld – Guitar
Jay Oliver – Keyboards
Randy Goodrum – Keyboards
Buzz Cason – Keyboards, background vocals
Don Kloetzke – Background vocals
Roger Bartlett – Acoustic guitar, electric guitar, harmony vocals (1974–1977) (the original guitarist; traveled with Jimmy as a duo in the early days)
Michael Jeffry – lead guitar, harmony vocals
Josh Leo – guitar
Vince Melamed – keyboards
Tony Pace – Drums
Timothy B. Schmit – bass, vocals (Schmit coined the term Parrotheads)
"Blind" Jay Spell – keyboards – (Died 2011)
Greg "Fingers" Taylor – harmonica (1975–2000, 2007)
T.C. Mitchell – saxophones and flute (1994–2005)
Amy Lee – saxophone and writer of the Buffett hit – Fruitcakes (1991–2005)
Mary Harris – Background vocals and vocal arrangements.
Barry Chance – lead guitar background vocals. (Died 2010)
Hadley Hockensmith – Bass
Claudia Cummings – Background vocals
Andy McMahon – Organ, Fender Rhodes
Bob Naylor – Mouth Organ, backing vocals
Harry Dailey – Bass, background vocals. Co-writer "Volcano." (1975–1982; died 2003)
Matt Betton – Drums
M.L. Benoit – Congas and percussion, background vocals
David Briggs – Piano
Dr. Kino Bachellier – Shakers and French
Norbert Putnam – Upright bass
Dominic Cortese – Accordion
Deborah McColl –  Background vocals
David "Cool" Persons – Guitars, Vocals
Reggie Young – Electric lead guitar
Mike Gardner – Drums – (Died 1991)
Ed "Lump" Williams – Bass guitar
Sammy Creason – Drums
Phil Royster – Congas
Johnny Gimble – Fiddle
Shane Keister – Moog synthesizer
Kenny Buttrey – Drums and Percussion (1977–1978)
Vassar Clements – Fiddle
Ferrell Morris – Percussion
Sam Clayton – Congas and Percussion (1982–1988)
Larry Lee – Guitar, Drums, Keyboards
Tim Krekel – lead guitar, backing vocala
Brie Howard – Percussion, Vocals
Russ Kunkel – Drums
Keith Sykes – Guitar

Timeline

Honorary members and special guests
Many artists have recorded and/or appeared on stage with Buffett, earning them status as honorary Coral Reefers. Some of the more notable names are listed here.
Paul McCartney – vocals
James Taylor – vocals
Grover Washington Jr. – saxophone
The Oak Ridge Boys – vocals
Sean Payton – bongos
Clint Black – vocals, harmonica
Ed Bradley – vocals, tambourine 
Rita Coolidge – vocals
Steve Cropper – guitar
Huey Lewis – vocals, harmonica
Sheryl Crow – vocals
Steve Winwood – vocals, organ
Harrison Ford – whip cracks
Glenn Frey – guitar, background vocals
Steve Goodman – guitar
 John Hiatt – guitar
J. J. Watt – percussion
Alan Jackson – vocals
Earl Klugh – guitar
Nicolette Larsen – vocals
Roy Orbison – vocals
Bill Payne – Keyboard
J.D. Souther – backing vocals
Sonny Landreth – slide guitar
Freedie Buffett – background vocals
Ilo Ferreira – vocals, guitar
Jake Shimabukuro – Ukulele (2005–2009)
Zac Brown – guitar and vocals
Bill Kreutzmann – drums
Ric Flair – drums and background "woo's"
Brian Wilson –  vocals

References

American country rock groups
Gulf and Western groups
Jimmy Buffett
Musical backing groups
Musical groups established in 1974